Thomas A. Russell (June 17, 1858 – April 8, 1938) was an American attorney who was the first law clerk at the Supreme Court of the United States.

Russell was born in Boston, Massachusetts, on June 17, 1858. His father, William Goodwin Russell, was a descendent of Mayflower passengers Myles Standish and John Alden.

In 1882, Russell graduated from Harvard Law School, and then became the first Supreme Court law clerk when he worked for Justice Horace Gray from 1882 to 1883. After his clerkship, Russell returned to Boston and from 1883 to 1886 worked for his father's law firm of Russell & Putnam. He then worked in private practice from 1896 to 1900.

In 1893 and 1894, Russell was elected from Suffolk County district 11 to the Massachusetts House of Representatives as a Republican, where he served as chairman of the Committee on Elections.

Russell died April 8, 1938, in Boston.

See also 
 List of law clerks of the Supreme Court of the United States (Seat 2)

References

1858 births
1938 deaths
Harvard Law School alumni
Law clerks of the Supreme Court of the United States
Lawyers from Washington, D.C.
Lawyers from Boston
19th-century American lawyers
20th-century American lawyers
Republican Party members of the Massachusetts House of Representatives